Lasca of the Rio Grande is a 1931 American pre-Code film based on the poem "Lasca" by Frank Desprez. 

Dorothy Burgess stars in the title role of Rio Grande dance hall girl Lasca who becomes involved in a love triangle between herself, her true love Miles Kincaid (Johnny Mack Brown), and wealthy Mexican ranchero Jose Santa Cruz (Leo Carrillo) who wants her for his bride. Cruz kidnaps both Lasca and Kincaid and holds them hostage on his ranch on the Mexican side of the Rio Grande.  When Lasca and Kincaid escape, they are caught in a cattle stampede during which Lasca is killed.

Cast
Leo Carrillo – Jose Santa Cruz 
Dorothy Burgess – Lasca
Johnny Mack Brown – Miles Kincaid
Frank Campeau – Jehosophat Smith 
Slim Summerville – "Crabapple" Thompson

References

External links
 
 
 
 

1931 films
American black-and-white films
1931 Western (genre) films
American Western (genre) films
1931 drama films
Universal Pictures films
Films directed by Edward Laemmle
1930s English-language films
1930s American films